Auriga Leader is a car carrier, owned by Nippon Yusen Kaisha, and used for mobile machineries and cars worldwide; for example, Mitsubishi vehicles from Japan to the rest of the world. A small amount of the ship's power is produced by photovoltaic panels.

Experimental 
Nippon Yusen Kaisha and Nippon Oil developed the Auriga Leader partly as an experimental vessel, where it is supposed to gather statistical research in how solar power can assist in powering a ship at sea. The ship's experimental stage was planned for two years.

Results 
The solar panels produced 1.4 times more energy on the ship at sea than on land in Tokyo. It is not known what factors had an impact on this, but it is suggested that being at sea means more sunlight and that the wind encountered cools off the panels and thus increases efficiency.

Efficiency 
The Auriga Leader's solar power capabilities produced an anticipated 0.05% of the ship's propulsion power and 1% of its electrical usage. This will contribute to lowering the ship's fuel usage by approximately 13 tonnes and its CO2 output by 40 tonnes per year.

References

Ships of Japan
Ships of the NYK Line
2008 ships
Ro-ro ships
Ships built by Mitsubishi Heavy Industries